Nachtmusik is the debut studio album of Lightwave, released in 1990 by Erdenklang Musikverlag.

Track listing

Personnel 
Adapted from the Nachtmusik liner notes.

Lightwave
 Christoph Harbonnier – electronics, sampler, illustrations
 Christian Wittman – electronics

Production and additional personnel
 Claude Chemin – illustrations
 Michel Geiss – mixing
 Mireille Landmann – mastering
 Lightwave – production
 Jean-Yves Lucas – illustrations

Release history

References

External links 
 

1990 debut albums
Lightwave (band) albums